Adolfo Cofiño (born 1931) is a Spanish art director. He has designed the sets for more than a hundred productions during his career.

Selected filmography
 Operación Plus Ultra  (1966)
 OK Connery (1967)
 Pasqualino Cammarata, Frigate Captain (1974)
 Dick Turpin (1974)
 Zorrita Martinez (1975)

References

Bibliography 
 Bentley, Bernard. A Companion to Spanish Cinema. Boydell & Brewer 2008.

External links 
 

1931 births
Living people
People from Madrid
Spanish art directors